Sally Causby (born 26 November 1977 in Gawler, South Australia) is an Australian former rower – a national champion and two time World Champion.

Club and state rowing
A South Australian, Causby's senior rowing was done with the Adelaide Rowing Club.

Causby contested the Australian national lightweight quad sculls championship in composite crews and wearing her Adelaide colours four times for four victories in 2001, 2002, 2003 and 2004.

Causby raced in South Australian representative women's lightweight quad sculls who contested the Victoria Cup at the Interstate Regatta in 2001, 2002 (to victory as stroke), 2003 (to a convincing 7 second victory).

International representative rowing
Causby made her first Australian senior representative appearance at the 2000 World Rowing Cup III in Lucerne, Switzerland. The next month that same crew contested the lightweight quad scull at the 2000 World Rowing Championships in Zagreb, Croatia and Causby won a silver medal crewed with Amber Halliday, Eliza Blair and Catriona Roach.
The following year at Lucerne 2001 that crew with Blair changed out for Josephine Lips won the gold medal and the lightweight quad scull world championship title. They set two world records in the process.

In 2002 teamed with Halliday in a double scull, Causby won her second World Championship title at Seville 2002. They stayed together for Milan 2003 and won the silver medal in the double scull. In 2004, she injured an intervertebral disc and was forced to take the year off, thus missing the Olympic selection regatta.

References 

 

1977 births
Living people
Australian female rowers
Sportswomen from South Australia
World Rowing Championships medalists for Australia
People from Gawler, South Australia
21st-century Australian women